Terre Roveresche is a comune (municipality) in the Province of Pesaro and Urbino in the Italian region Marche.

It was established on 1 January 2017 by the merger of Barchi, Orciano di Pesaro, Piagge and San Giorgio di Pesaro.

References

Cities and towns in the Marche